Daniel Aguilera (born 30 July 1988) was a Chilean footballer.

He played for Cobresal.

References
 
 

1988 births
Living people
Chilean footballers
Cobresal footballers
Chilean Primera División players
Association football defenders